The Toyota Sprinter Marino is a four-door hardtop version of the Toyota Sprinter sedan produced between 1992 and 1998 (series E100 Corolla) for sale in Japan. The Toyota Corolla Ceres is a slightly restyled version of the Sprinter Marino, as was common practice by Japanese automakers in the 1980s and 1990s.

Overview 

The Corolla Ceres is named after Ceres in Roman mythology, and the Sprinter Marino is named for Marino, Italy. The Corolla Ceres was exclusive to Toyota Corolla Store locations, and the Sprinter Marino was exclusive to Toyota Vista Store locations.

In Japan, the Sprinter Marino and the Corolla Ceres could be ordered by mail order catalog. Both vehicles were built for Toyota under contract by Kanto Auto Works. Due to cost-cutting efforts as a result of the Japanese economic recession caused by the collapse of the Japanese asset price bubble, both vehicles were cancelled and ceased production in Japan on June 6, 1998. The market segment occupied by the Sprinter Marino and Corolla Ceres was served by a new concept of vehicles Toyota manufactured under the WiLL brand, that was shared with products from other Japanese manufacturers and service providers.

The hardtop approach was used on various segments of core Toyota sedans by offering a more upscale hardtop version. These cars were offered for consumers who wanted the luxurious approach offered by the Toyota Crown hardtop and sedan, as well as the Mark II (4-door sedan), Cresta (4-door hardtop) and Chaser (4-door hardtop and performance enhancements), and the next segment down on the Corona and Carina, called the Toyota Corona EXiV and the Toyota Carina ED which were all offered at reduced prices and reduced tax liability based on the vehicles size and engine displacement. The Ceres/Marino twins saw competition from other Japanese manufacturers in this size classification, such as the Nissan Presea, the Mazda Lantis, and the Honda Integra.

Features

Powertrain 
The Toyota Sprinter Marino was available with four options, the more common 1587 cc Twin Cam 16 Valve DOHC 4AFE engine, 1487 cc Twin Cam 16 Valve DOHC 5AFE, the rare 1587 cc Twin Cam 20 Valve DOHC Silver Top 4AGE and the even rarer 1587 cc Twin Cam 20 Valve Black Top 4AGE. The Silver Top 4AGE engine produces 160 hp (at 7500 rpm) and the 2nd most powerful of the high performance 4AGE Toyota motors ever made, only beaten by the Black Top 4AGE which is around  more powerful (available in the Sprinter Marino 1997 to 1998 with 6 speed manual or 4 speed auto).

The Marino featured a specially developed five-speed manual gearbox as well as an automatic version and optional limited slip differential.

Safety 
A driver's airbag was available after 1995.

Trim 
 Marino F – 5AFE – 5SPD MAN, 4SPD AUTO
 Marino F Extra PKG – 5AFE – 5SPD MAN, 4SPD AUTO
 Marino X – 5AFE – 5SPD MAN, 4SPD AUTO 4SPD AUTO ECTS option available on A/T
 Marino X Extra PKG – 4AFE – 5SPD MAN, 4SPD AUTO ECTS option available on A/T
 Marino GT – 20V 4AGE – 5SPD MAN, 4SPD AUTO ECTS option available on A/T
 Marino GT Extra PKG – 20V 4AGE – 5SPD MAN, 4SPD AUTO ECTS option available on A/T
Marino GT and Marino GT Extra PKG as of 1997 used 6SP MAN, 4SPD AUTO ECTS option available on A/T

References

External links 

 GAZOO.com Toyota Sprinter Marino X 1992 Car of the Year (Japanese)

Sprinter Marino
Sedans
Front-wheel-drive vehicles
1990s cars
Touring cars